Once Smitten is the debut album by electronic musician Elliott Power. It was released on 24 February 2016 by Marathon Artists in collaboration with Mo' Wax.

Track listing

Personnel 
Credits adapted from Once Smitten album liner notes.

 Anthony Specter – A&R
 James Lavelle – A&R, creative director
 James Macintosh  – acoustic guitar
 Angus McLaughlin  – acoustic guitar, bass guitar
 Ben Drury – art direction, design
 Warren Du Preez and Nick Thornton Jones – art direction, photography
 Neale Easterby and Richard Ramsey – artist management
 Grace Chatto – cello
 Paul-René Albertini – chief executive office
 Callum Finn – co-producer, vocals
 Elliott Power  – creative director, vocals
 Stephanie Haughton – creative project manager
 Johnny Brister – drums, percussion
 Ben Williams – engineer
 Tom Carmichael  – engineer
 Jimmy Mikaoui – managing director
 Pru Harris – marketing
 Mike Marsh – mastering
 Dorian Lutz  – mixing, producer, programmer, vocals
 Stoppa – percussion
 Charlie Smith – product manager
 Philippe Ascoli – senior A&R
 Helen Fleming – digital content
 Victoria Wood – solicitor 
 Joseph Fisher  – viola
 Anna Kirkpatrick – violin
 Chalin Barton – vocals

References

External links 
 

2016 debut albums
Elliott Power albums
Marathon Artists albums